Junior Senior may refer to:

Junior Senior, Danish pop musical duo
Junior Senior (2002 film), Indian Tamil film
Junior Senior (2005 film), Indian Malayalam film

See also
Junior, Senior & Big League Baseball, youth baseball divisions of Little League Baseball
Junior and senior, generational titles
Junior (disambiguation)
Senior (disambiguation)